Old Cummer GO Station is a train and bus station in the GO Transit network located in the North York district of Toronto, Ontario, Canada. It is a stop on the Richmond Hill line train service and offers service to Union Station in downtown Toronto.

In September 2004 construction began on a rehabilitated station building, providing improved lighting and providing accessible features into the station building.

Connecting transit

Local transit services are provided by the Toronto Transit Commission with buses along Leslie Street (every 20-30mins) and frequent services along Finch Avenue (3-4min frequency during peak). Stairs and a footbridge across Finch Avenue provide pedestrian access to the south end of the station platform.

The Canadian, VIA Rail's train between Vancouver and Toronto Union Station, passes through Old Cummer station but does not stop.

References

External links

GO Transit railway stations
Railway stations in Toronto
North York
Railway stations in Canada opened in 1978
1978 establishments in Ontario